Hotel d'Angelis was a luxury hotel and restaurant established in 1906 by Giacomo D'Angelis at Mount Road, Madras, India. The hotel is considered to have spearheaded the introduction of modern technology in India.

History

Giacomo D'Angelis, a Corsican confectioner arrived in India in 1880 and set up Maison Francaise in Mount Road in the same year. D'Angelis described Maison Francaise as a  "manufacturing confectioner, glacie & C., general purveyor and mess contractor". The firm was the first in India to operate a catering service and became the official caterer to the Governor of Madras  during the time of Lord Ampthill.

In 1906, D'Angelis founded "Hotel d'Angelis" at the Anna statue junction, where Blacker's Road meets Mount Road. The hotel was the first in Madras to have an electric lift, hot water taps, electric fans, imported tiles, ice-making plant and cold storage.

The hotel was later sold to the Madras-based Bosotto Brothers bakeries company. It was eventually renamed the Airlines Hotel. In the 1970s, Bata established a shoe store on the ground level, and the building became known as the Bata Building. It was demolished in 2018.

See also

 Hotels in Chennai

References

External links

 Giacomo D'Angelis, first to fly in Asia (Madras 10 March 1910)

Restaurants in Chennai
Defunct restaurants
Heritage hotels in India
1906 establishments in India